Triangle Downtowner Magazine (originally called Raleigh Downtowner Magazine) is a free entertainment magazine based in Raleigh, North Carolina covering downtown Raleigh, North Hills, downtown Durham, Cary/Apex, Wake Forest, and the surrounding area. Founded in 2005, the magazine features topics including restaurant profiles, local business, art gallery reviews, visual and performing artist profiles, wine, local history, and more. The Triangle Downtowner Magazine print and online issues have a readership of over 145,000 per month and is distributed at over 360 locations in restaurants, office buildings, businesses, condos, bars, government buildings, and outside newsracks throughout Triangle. The print edition is available online in its entirety, with issues dating back to 2006.

The Triangle Downtowner was founded by brothers Randall and Crash Gregg, and public speaker/greenspace supporter and Wake County Board Commissioner Sig Hutchinson, who saw the need for a magazine to chronicle the growth of downtown Raleigh. The magazine is a strong supporter of local business, community involvement and entrepreneurism, and is a contributor to many non-profits and charities.

In 2012, the magazine's office sustained damages from a fire.

References

External links 
 

Mass media in Raleigh, North Carolina
Magazines published in North Carolina
Free magazines
Magazines established in 2005